Count Karl Wilhelm von Toll (9 April 1777, Keskvere, Governorate of Estonia – 5 May 1842) was a Baltic German aristocrat and Russian subject who served in the Imperial Russian Army in the campaigns against the Napoleonic Army.

Origins
Karl Wilhelm von Toll was the son of Conrad Friedrich von Toll (27 March 1749 – 3 February 1821) and Justine Wilhelmine Ruckteschell (born 18 January 1752). His family was of Dutch origins, but had settled in Sweden in the 15th century. One of his forebears had served as an emissary for Sweden to Ivan the Terrible, and had been rewarded for this service with lands in Estonia.

Career
Toll began his military career in 1796 after a period in the infantry cadet corps under the command of Mikhail Kutuzov. He first saw action in the Swiss expedition of Alexander Suvarov in 1799-1800 and took part in the war of the War of the Third Coalition in 1805. He fought at Austerlitz, in the Turkish campaigns from 1806 to 1809, and in the War of the Sixth Coalition, notably at Leipzig. In 1812 he was named Quartermaster General of the First Army and commanded the evacuation of Moscow. He subsequently led troops at Brienne and Fère-Champenoise, and entered Paris in 1815.

He was named general-adjutant to the emperor in 1823, and infantry general in 1825. In the 1829 campaign against the Turks, General von Toll was chief of the general staff. For his role in the victory at Kulevicha he was granted the title of count by Tsar Nicholas I. During the Polish campaign of 1831, he served as chief of the general staff of Hans Karl von Diebitsch, and succeeded von Diebitsch upon his death. He took part in the siege of Warsaw by Paskevich in September 1831 and succeeded wounded Paskevich as a commander in chief during the final stages of the assault of the city. In 1833 he served on the state council as minister of transport, in which capacity he paid  special attention to the Institute of Transport Engineers. He subsequently retired to his estate in the Governorate of Estonia.

Count von Toll was the landowner of Aruküla Manor in present-day Estonia, which he rebuilt in a neoclassical style. He is buried in the family chapel on the grounds of the estate. The chapel was restored in 1996.

References 
 Bernhardi: Denkwürdigkeiten aus dem Leben des Grafen von Toll, 2. Auflage, Leipzig 1866, 4 Bände
 Jaromir Hirtenfeld: Der Militär-Maria-Theresien-Orden und seine Mitglieder, Wien 1857, S.1284

Further reading

External links 
 Genealogisches Handbuch der baltischen Ritterschaften

1777 births
1842 deaths
People from Lääne-Nigula Parish
People from the Governorate of Estonia
Baltic-German people
Baltic nobility
Imperial Russian Army generals
Russian commanders of the Napoleonic Wars
Knights Cross of the Military Order of Maria Theresa